The Mro-Khimi people, also known as Mro,  Awa Khami Mro, Wakim, Mro Chin or  Awa Khami, are one of the 135 ethnic groups recognized by the government of Myanmar. They are identified as a sub-group of Chin people. They live widely in some parts of northern Rakhine state, Chin state, the townships of Matupi and Paletwa, and the regions of Samechaung and Michaung. They are Tibeto-Burman and have their own language, culture and customs which are still in existence. For Chin specifically, the Mro People are one of 53 sub-groups identified by the government of Myanmar.
According to the Rakhine Chronicles, the Mro people were the first people who enter Rakhine land. They call themselves as Khami. It means 'human'. Mro people has their own language, culture. There are more than 100 clans.

The Mro people once ruled as emperors in Rakhine State and established two "Mro" dynasties. The dynasty lasted for about 25 years, from 131 AD to 156 AD.

Origin
The Mro people were descended from the area known as Twipin (Tibet). From there, they moved slowly to the south. After that, they lived in Rokon for about thirty years. From there, they arrived at Cha Phawi Mountain and lived there for about 300 years, then moved to Khang Lyhn Mawi in Paletwa and descended to Rakhine State.

Language

The Mro people speak Mro-Khimi, which belongs to the Kuki-Chin branch of the Sino-Tibetan language family.

References

Hornéy, Christina Scotte. 2012. A phonological analysis of Mro Khimi. MA thesis, University of North Dakota.

External links
List of ethnic groups in Myanmar
Essay on the Chin peoples

Ethnic groups in Myanmar